Asterolepis is a genus of moths belonging to the subfamily Tortricinae of the family Tortricidae.

Species
Asterolepis brandti Common, 1965
Asterolepis chlorissa (Razowski, 1966)
Asterolepis cypta Razowski, 2012
Asterolepis dipterocarpi Razowski, 2012
Asterolepis earina Common, 1965
Asterolepis engis Razowski, 2012
Asterolepis glycera (Meyrick, 1910)

See also
List of Tortricidae genera

References

 , 2005: World Catalogue of Insects vol. 5 Tortricidae.
 , 2012: Descriptions of new Tortricini from the Oriental and Australian regions (Lepidoptera: Tortricidae). Shilap Revista de Lepidopterologia 40 (159): 315–335. Full article: .

External links
tortricidae.com

Tortricini
Tortricidae genera
Taxa named by Józef Razowski